Tig is an ncurses-based text-mode interface for Git. It functions mainly as a Git repository browser, but it can also assist in staging changes for committing at the chunk level and can act as a pager for output from various Git commands.

References

Git (software)